A by-election was held for the New South Wales Legislative Assembly electorate of Central Cumberland on 14 May 1888 because of the resignation of Andrew McCulloch who was facing financial difficulties. He announced his intention to recontest the seat at the by-election, however he decided not to stand.

Dates

Result

				

The by-election was caused by the resignation of Andrew McCulloch.

See also
Electoral results for the district of Central Cumberland
List of New South Wales state by-elections

References

1888 elections in Australia
New South Wales state by-elections
1880s in New South Wales